Craniopsidae is an extinct family of craniiform brachiopods which lived from the Lower Cambrian (Botomian) to the Lower Carboniferous (Tournaisian). It is the only family in the monotypic superfamily Craniopsoidea and the monotypic order Craniopsida.

Craniopsids were among the earliest and simplest brachiopods to appear. The calcitic shell was rounded in profile and biconvex, with both valves equally convex. Like other craniiforms, they had two pairs of adductor (vertical closing) muscles and two pairs of oblique (diagonal sliding) muscles, with the muscle scars shifted to near the center of the shell. They show some similarities with kirengellids, a group of problematic Cambrian fossil shells of marine organisms.

References

External links 

 
 
 Craniopsodae at fossiilid.info

Craniopsida
Prehistoric protostome families
Brachiopod families
Cambrian first appearances
Carboniferous extinctions